Đurđin is a village located in the Subotica municipality, in the North Bačka District of Serbia. It is situated in the autonomous province of Vojvodina. The village is ethnically mixed and its population numbering 1,746 people (2002 census).

Name
In Serbian the village is known as Ђурђин or Đurđin, in Croatian as Đurđin, in Bunjevac as Đurđin, and in Hungarian as Györgyén.

Ethnic groups (2002 census)
Croats = 677 (38.77%)
Serbs = 484 (27.72%)
Bunjevci = 251 (14.38%)
Hungarians = 124 (7.10%)
Yugoslavs = 67 (3.84%)

Historical population
1961: 2,992
1971: 2,805
1981: 2,297
1991: 1,911

References
Slobodan Ćurčić, Broj stanovnika Vojvodine, Novi Sad, 1996.

See also
List of cities, towns and villages in Vojvodina
List of places in Serbia

Places in Bačka
Subotica
Bunjevci